Sar Cham or Sarcham may refer to:
 Sar Cham, Ilam
 Sarcham-e Deh Harun, Ilam Province
 Sar Cham, Kurdistan
 Sarcham-e Olya, Zanjan Province
 Sarcham-e Sofla, Zanjan Province

See also